Cao Lộc is a rural district of Lạng Sơn province in the Northeast region of Vietnam. As of 2003, the district had a population of 75,980. The district covers an area of 644 km². The district capital lies at Cao Lộc.

Administrative divisions
Cao Lộc, Đồng Đăng (site of the border crossing), Tân Thành, Xuân Long, Yên Trạch, Tân Liên, Gia Cát, Cống Sơn, Mẫu Sơn, Xuất Lễ, Cao Lâu, Hải Yến, Lộc Yên, Thanh Lòa, Hòa Cư, Hợp Thành, Thạch Đạn, Bảo Lâm, Thụy Hùng, Song Giáp, Phú Xá, Bình Trung, Hồng Phong.

References

Districts of Lạng Sơn province
Lạng Sơn province